Cleo Odzer ( Sheila Lynne Odzer, April 6, 1950 – March 26, 2001) was an American writer who authored books on prostitution in Thailand, the hippie culture of Goa, India, and cybersex.

Childhood and time as a groupie
Cleo Odzer grew up in Manhattan, New York City, the daughter of Rena Abelson Odzer and Harry Odzer. Her father, president of a textile company, died when she was 16 years old. She attended Franklin School (now Dwight School) and Quintano's School for Young Professionals, graduating from the latter in 1968. At about that time, she began writing about the music scene for a small Greenwich Village newspaper. Odzer met Keith Emerson, then member of the rock band the Nice and later of Emerson, Lake & Palmer, at The Scene nightclub. After receiving a Christmas gift from Emerson in 1968, she reported to the press that they were engaged. According to Keith Emerson's account in his 2003 autobiography Pictures of an Exhibitionist, there was no actual engagement and Emerson learned about the "engagement" from the same February 1969 Time magazine article that published her photo and described her as a "Super Groupie". Odzer later claimed that the article was the reason for breaking off the "engagement".

Shortly thereafter in 1969, Odzer recorded an album called The Groupies, produced by Alan Lorber, which essentially consisted of interviews with Cleo and some friends describing their adventures meeting (and sleeping with) rock musicians.

Hippie years in Goa
In the early 1970s, Odzer traveled in Europe and the Middle East and worked as a model. She spent the late 1970s in the hippie culture of Anjuna, Goa in India. Her experiences there, including heavy use of cocaine and heroin, the international drug smuggling used to finance the stay, and her subsequent two-week incarceration, would later form the basis of her second book, Goa Freaks: My Hippie Years in India (1995). For a time she followed the teachings of Bhagwan Shree Rajneesh in India.

Return to U.S.; research in Thailand
After her return to the United States in the late 1970s, Odzer underwent drug treatment at Daytop in New York. She entered college, then graduate school, and in 1990 obtained a Ph.D. in anthropology from the New School for Social Research in New York City with a thesis on prostitution in Thailand. Beginning in 1987, she had spent three years in Thailand to research this topic. In her dissertation, she describes case studies of 17 people connected to the sex industry in Patpong. She concludes that the economic opportunities provided by sex work do not translate into a higher status of women, because of persistent stigma and ideas about gender inequality in Thai society. Her experiences in Thailand were described in her first book, Patpong Sisters: An American Woman's View of the Bangkok Sex World (1994). In this work she describes the Thai prostitutes she got to know as quick-witted entrepreneurs rather than exploited victims, sometimes revered in their poor home villages. She also relates her own problematic affair with a Thai pimp boyfriend.

Following publication of the book, Odzer worked at Daytop in New York, the drug rehabilitation organization she herself had attended earlier.

From 1995 to 1998, Odzer produced several dozen episodes of her show Cleo's Adventures for Manhattan Neighborhood Network public-access television. Her third book, Virtual Spaces: Sex and the Cyber Citizen (1997), deals with cybersex. She appeared in episode 1.21 of SexTV in 1999, with a segment on cybersex.

Return to Goa, and death
In 1999, disappointed with life in New York, Odzer returned to Goa, where some of the remaining old-time hippies disliked her because of the publicity her book had brought to the scene. She died there in 2001. A good friend of hers who had been corresponding with Odzer during her final stay in India, "Cookie" (with whom she had recorded The Groupies), reports that Odzer's doctor (who had been away when she died) said she probably died of a stroke related to very high cholesterol and serious circulatory problems that she was being treated for during her final year, and that her body had been cremated after a small service.  But a researcher, Arun Saldanha, who interviewed members of the Goa community about Odzer, reports being told by a psychiatrist at the Goa Medical College some ten months after her death that her body had lain unclaimed in a morgue in Mapusa for more than a month until finally she had been buried in Mapusa without a funeral, and that she had had AIDS. Saldanha also reports having seen Odzer use cocaine during an interview he had with her sometime before her death.

The 2002 documentary Last Hippie Standing by Marcus Robbin covered the Goa scene and featured some of Cleo Odzer's old super-8 footage from the 1970s. She was interviewed by Robbins for the film in Goa shortly before her death, and said:

The film was dedicated to her memory.

References

External links
 Cleo Odzer's website
 Yahoo discussion group about Cleo Odzer
 Marcus Robbin, Interview with Cleo Odzer, January 2000, Goa, India. Overview, Part 1, Part 2, Part 3, Part 4, Part 5, Part 6, Part 7, Part 8, Part 9
 Excerpts from Patpong Sisters. Urban Desires, Volume 1, Issue 1, December 1994
 Cleo Odzer: Culture Shock. Urban Desires, Volume 2, Issue 2, June/July 1996. Interview about infidelity, especially in Thai society.
 Last Hippie Standing, complete documentary with interviews with Cleo
 Her album The Groupies
Cleo Odzer's 50th birthday party in Anjuna/ Goa

1950 births
2001 deaths
20th-century American women writers
Groupies
Hippies
The New School alumni
20th-century American anthropologists